Relámpago (P-43) is the third ship of the Meteoro class, a new kind of offshore patrol vessel created for the Spanish Navy and called BAMs.

References

Ships of the Spanish Navy
Buque de Acción Marítima
Ships built in Spain
2010 ships